A Baroque orchestra is an ensemble for mixed instruments that existed during the Baroque era of Western Classical music, commonly identified as 1600–1750. Baroque orchestras are typically much smaller, in terms of the number of performers, than their Romantic-era counterparts. Baroque orchestras originated in France where Jean-Baptiste Lully added the newly re-designed hautbois (oboe) and transverse flutes to his orchestra, Les Vingt-quatre Violons du Roi ("The Twenty-Four Violins of the King"). As well as violins and woodwinds, baroque orchestras often contained basso continuo instruments such as the theorbo, the lute, the harpsichord and the pipe organ.

 

In the Baroque period, the size of an orchestra was not standardised. There were large differences in size, instrumentation and playing styles—and therefore in orchestral soundscapes and palettes—between the various European regions. The 'Baroque orchestra' ranged from smaller orchestras (or ensembles) with one player per part, to larger scale orchestras with many players per part. Examples of the smaller variety were Bach's orchestras, for example in Koethen where he had access to an ensemble of up to 18 players. Examples of large scale Baroque orchestras would include Corelli's orchestra in Rome which ranged between 35 and 80 players for day-to-day performances, being enlarged to 150 players for special occasions.

Early-music ensembles today
The term Baroque orchestra is commonly used today to refer to chamber orchestras giving historically informed performances of baroque or classical music on period Baroque instruments or replica instruments.  

The period-instrument revival of the 1970s inspired the development of the first period-instrument baroque orchestras, led by Nikolaus Harnoncourt, Gustav Leonhardt, Frans Bruggen and Terrence Holford.  

Since the 1970s many baroque orchestras have been formed across Europe, as well as some in North America. Baroque orchestras active in the 2010s include:

Academy of Ancient Music
American Bach Soloists
Amsterdam Baroque Orchestra
Apollo’s Fire: The Cleveland Baroque Orchestra
Arcadia Players
Arion Baroque Orchestra
Les Arts Florissants
Atlanta Baroque Orchestra
Barocco sempre giovane
Boston Baroque
Bourbon Baroque: Louisville's Period Instrument Ensemble
La Chapelle Rhénane
Collegium 1704
Collegium Marianum
Concerto Italiano
Concerto Köln
The English Baroque Soloists
The English Concert
Europa Galante
Florilegium
La Folia Barockorchester
Freiburger Barockorchester
Göteborg Baroque
Il Giardino Armonico
The Hanover Band
Hespèrion XX and Hespèrion XXI
Indianapolis Baroque Orchestra
Modo Antiquo
Musica Antiqua Köln
Musicians of the King's Road (Finnish: Kuninkaantien muusikot)
Netherlands Bach Society (Dutch: Nederlandse Bachvereniging)
New Dutch Academy
New Trinity Baroque
Newport Baroque Orchestra
Orchestra of the Age of Enlightenment
Les Paladins
Philharmonia Baroque Orchestra
Portland Baroque Orchestra
Taverner Consort and Players
Tafelmusik Baroque Orchestra
Tempesta di Mare: The Philadelphia Baroque Orchestra
Venice Baroque Orchestra
Wrocław Baroque Orchestra

Instrumentation

Baroque orchestra

Woodwinds
2 Flutes
2 Oboes
2 Bassoons

Brass
2 Natural horns
2 Natural trumpets

Percussion
Timpani (e.g., Handel's Messiah)

 
Keyboards and other chord-playing instruments selected by the ensemble leader
 Harpsichord
 Pipe organ
 Lute
 Theorbo

Strings
Violin I 
Violin II 
Viola 
Violoncello 
Double bass (and/or bass violones or other low-pitched bowed strings)

Recordings of baroque music
Corelli Concerti Grossi
Antonio Vivaldi, Pietro Locatelli

See also
 List of early music ensembles

References

Orchestras